Fuji Sengen Shrine may refer to:

 Fuji Sengen Shrine (Naka-ku, Nagoya)
 Fuji Sengen Shrine (Nishi-ku, Nagoya)

Religious buildings and structures disambiguation pages